Helygia may refer to:
 a synonym for Parsonsia, a genus of woody vines of the family Apocynaceae
 Helygia (wasp), an insect genus in the subfamily Encyrtinae